

The Beecraft Queen Bee was an American V-tailed four-seat cabin monoplane, designed and built by Bee Aviation Associates (Beecraft).

Development
The Queen Bee was an all-metal cantilever low-wing monoplane powered by a Lycoming O-320-A1A flat-four piston engine. It had a V-tail and an electrically retractable tricycle landing gear. The canopy shared a similar shape as the Ryan Navion. The wings were outfitted with fiberglass tip tanks. A 180 hp Lycoming O-360-A-1-A was planned as an optional engine.

Only a prototype was built and the aircraft did not enter production. The Queen Bee prototype was destroyed when the original San Diego Aerospace Museum burned down in 1978.

Specifications

References

Notes

Bibliography

 

1960s United States civil utility aircraft
Low-wing aircraft
Aircraft first flown in 1960
Queen Bee
V-tail aircraft
Single-engined tractor aircraft